SS Spitfire may refer to a former United States Navy oiler, or to one of two Type C2-S-B1 ships built for the United States Maritime Commission:
  (MC hull number 1160), built by Moore Dry Dock in Oakland, California; later became USS Capricornus (AKA-57/LKA-57); scrapped in 1985
  (MC hull number 2818), built by Consolidated Steel in Wilmington, California; scrapped in 1975

Ship names